Quinn Russell Bailey (born October 18, 1995) is an American football offensive tackle for the Denver Broncos of the National Football League (NFL). He was signed by the Broncos as an undrafted free agent in 2019 following his college football career at Arizona State.

Professional career
Bailey signed with the Denver Broncos as an undrafted free agent following the 2019 NFL Draft on April 30, 2019. He was waived during final roster cuts on August 31, 2019, and signed to the team's practice squad the next day. He was promoted to the active roster on December 24, 2019.

The next season, Bailey was again waived during final roster cuts on September 5, 2020, and re-signed to the practice squad the next day. He was elevated to the active roster on November 14 for the team's week 10 game against the Las Vegas Raiders, and reverted to the practice squad after the game. He signed a reserve/future contract on January 4, 2021.

On August 31, 2021, Bailey was waived by the Broncos and re-signed to the practice squad the next day. He was promoted to the active roster on January 7, 2022.

On August 30, 2022, Bailey was waived by the Broncos and signed to the practice squad the next day. He was promoted to the active roster on November 19.

References

External links
Denver Broncos bio
Arizona State Sun Devils football bio

1995 births
Living people
People from Gilbert, Arizona
Players of American football from Arizona
Sportspeople from the Phoenix metropolitan area
American football offensive tackles
Arizona State Sun Devils football players
Denver Broncos players